Robert Edward Leiter (born March 22, 1941) is a Canadian former professional ice hockey player, most notably for the Atlanta Flames of the National Hockey League. He spent ten seasons in the NHL and one season in the World Hockey Association between 1962 to 1976.

Playing career
After a junior career that saw him playing on a Memorial Cup winner with the Winnipeg Braves in 1959, Leiter—whose rights were owned by the Boston Bruins—spent most of the next decade in the minor leagues.  Derailed by a bout of tuberculosis, occasional injuries and the perception that he would serve better as a defensive player, he served two seasons for the Kingston Frontenacs of the Eastern Professional Hockey League and six with the Hershey Bears of the American Hockey League, playing only large sections of the 1963 and 1964 seasons with the Bruins.

By 1967 there was no place on the newly powerful Bruins for Leiter, and he was a fixture on the Bears, where he was a scoring leader his final four seasons.  1971, his final year in Hershey, was his best, leading the team in scoring and being named to the AHL's Second All-Star Team.

Following that season, the Pittsburgh Penguins bought Leiter from the Bruins, and he became a NHL regular at last.  When expansion came in 1972, Leiter was chosen by the Atlanta Flames in the expansion draft as its 17th pick.  Despite being chosen inauspiciously low, Leiter led the team in scoring in its inaugural year and was a mainstay with his two-way play.  He finished second in team scoring the following season.

However, injuries and age eroded his scoring skills, and he was released by the Flames early in the 1976 season.  Leiter signed with the Calgary Cowboys of the World Hockey Association to finish the season, after which he retired.

Career statistics

Regular season and playoffs

Awards and achievements
 Turnbull Cup MJHL Championship (1959)
 Memorial Cup Championship (1959)
 AHL Second All-Star Team (1971)
 Honoured Member of the Manitoba Hockey Hall of Fame

External links

1941 births
Living people
Atlanta Flames players
Boston Bruins players
Calgary Cowboys players
Canadian ice hockey centres
Hershey Bears players
Kingston Frontenacs (EPHL) players
Pittsburgh Penguins players
San Francisco Seals (ice hockey) players
Ice hockey people from Winnipeg
Winnipeg Braves players
Winnipeg Maroons players
Winnipeg Warriors (minor pro) players